
Gmina Nowy Dwór Gdański is an urban-rural gmina (administrative district) in Nowy Dwór Gdański County, Pomeranian Voivodeship, in northern Poland.

Villages
Apart from the town of Nowy Dwór Gdański, Gmina Nowy Dwór Gdański contains the villages and settlements of Cyganek, Cyganka, Gozdawa, Jazowa, Jazowa Druga, Kępiny Małe, Kępki, Kmiecin, Łączki Myszewskie, Leśnowo, Lubieszewo, Lubieszewo Pierwsze, Lubieszynek Drugi, Marynowy, Marzęcino, Myszewko, Myszkowo, Nowinki, Orliniec, Orłówko, Orłowo, Orłowskie Pole, Osłonka, Pieczewo, Piotrowo, Powalina, Rakowe Pole, Rakowiska, Rakowo, Robakowiec, Różewo, Rychnowo Żuławskie, Ryki, Solnica, Starocin, Stawiec, Stobna, Suchowo, Swaryszewo, Trojaki, Tuja, Wężowiec, Wężownica, Wierciny, Zawadka and Żelichowo.

Neighbouring gminas
Gmina Nowy Dwór Gdański is bordered by the gminas of Elbląg, Gronowo Elbląskie, Nowy Staw, Ostaszewo, Stegna and Sztutowo.

References
Polish official population figures 2006

Nowy Dwor Gdanski
Nowy Dwór Gdański County